Illya Marchenko was the defending champion but chose not to defend his title.

Viktor Galović won the title after defeating Mirza Bašić 7–6(7–3), 6–4 in the final.

Seeds

Draw

Finals

Top half

Bottom half

References
Main Draw
Qualifying Draw

Guzzini Challenger - Singles
2017 Singles